Day by Day is an American sitcom television series created by Andy Borowitz and Gary David Goldberg, which aired on NBC from February 29, 1988 to June 4, 1989. It stars Douglas Sheehan, Linda Kelsey, Christopher Daniel Barnes, Julia Louis-Dreyfus, Courtney Thorne-Smith, and Thora Birch in her television debut role.

Synopsis
The show centers on Brian and Kate Harper, a married couple with two successful careers (Brian as a stockbroker, Kate as a lawyer) and a teenage son named Ross. After the couple had a second child, their daughter, Emily, they decided to quit their jobs because they had missed all the best times of Ross growing up and decided not to make the same mistake with Emily.

With that thought in mind, they decided to open a daycare center in their home. The episodes mixed stories about the daycare center with those about Ross and his friends. At first, Ross wasn't too enthusiastic about the idea of his father and mother being at home all the time, because he loved his independence and girl-chasing. He was more than a bit put out with all the bonding his dad wanted to do now.

Louis-Dreyfus played Eileen Swift, their materialistic next-door neighbor who was also once a business associate of Brian's. She didn't much like the idea of the Harpers running a day care center, and often tried to persuade them both to return to their former careers, always to no avail. Eileen, who was single and childless, was prone to make some very sarcastic quips about the children's activities, but Brian and Kate didn't let it bother them.

Thorne-Smith played the baby's nanny Kristin, who also worked in the daycare center. Kristin was perhaps the reason that Ross relented about his parents running the day care center; he had a crush on her.

Day by Day was connected to another NBC series, Family Ties. The family patriarch, Brian Harper (played by Sheehan) was a college roommate of Steven Keaton (Michael Gross). A total of 33 episodes were produced.

"A Very Brady Episode"
The episode titled "A Very Brady Episode" aired on February 5, 1989, and reunited six cast members from The Brady Bunch – Ann B. Davis, Florence Henderson, Christopher Knight, Mike Lookinland, Maureen McCormick, and Robert Reed. 

In this episode, Ross is lectured by Brian and Kate about his poor study habits. Ross's explanation that he was watching a Brady Bunch marathon only angers his parents more, and he is warned to shape up. Ross bemoans his predicament, noting Mike Brady would never yell at him because he had flagging grades.

Ross falls asleep, and finds himself in the opening credits of The Brady Bunch., where he dreams that he is the Bradys' long-lost son, Chuck. After he gets his hair permed at Mike's suggestion, he visits with the various family members (except Greg, Jan, and Cindy), who reprise some of the scenes in the Bradys' most famous episodes ("Chuck" and Marcia running against each other for class president, "Chuck" being bullied by Buddy Hinton episode, etc.)

After "Chuck" gets some advice about his poor grades from Mike, the family begins to repeat their dialogue. "Chuck" wonders what's amiss, and Carol explains what he's seeing is a rerun. Everything becomes chaotic and Ross wakes up, vowing to improve his study habits.

Christopher Daniel Barnes, who played Ross on the series, would later portray Greg Brady in The Brady Bunch Movie and A Very Brady Sequel.

Cast
Douglas Sheehan as Brian Harper
Linda Kelsey as Kate Harper
Christopher Daniel Barnes as Ross Harper
Julia Louis-Dreyfus as Eileen Swift
Courtney Thorne-Smith as Kristin Carlson
Thora Birch as Molly

Episodes

Season 1 (1988)

Season 2 (1988–89)

Syndication
After the show's initial run, reruns were shown on the Lifetime Television network and TV Land for several years.

Home media
One episode of the series has been released to DVD in the November 5, 2013 "Family Ties: The Complete Series" DVD boxset release. The episode included is "Trading Places", which featured a crossover between Family Ties and Day by Day, wherein Steven Keaton dropped Andy off for daycare with the Harpers.

References

External links

1988 American television series debuts
1989 American television series endings
1980s American sitcoms
Crossover television
English-language television shows
NBC original programming
Television series by CBS Studios
American television spin-offs
Television series about families
Television series by Ubu Productions
Television series created by Gary David Goldberg
Television series created by Andy Borowitz
Television shows set in Philadelphia